Gyrocerviceanseris is a genus of monogeneans in the family Gyrodactylidae. It consists of one species, Gyrocerviceanseris passamaquoddyensis Cone, Abbott, Gilmore & Burt, 2010.

References

Gyrodactylidae
Monogenea genera
Monotypic platyhelminthes genera